Dominique Fabien Canti (born 17 February 1967) is a former Sammarinese sprinter who competed in the men's 100m competition at the 1992 Summer Olympics. He recorded an 11.14, not enough to qualify for the next round past the heats. His personal best is 10.60, set in 1992. Additionally, he was on San Marino's 4 × 100 m relay team in the 1992 Olympiad, where they timed at 42.08. At the 1988 Summer Olympics, he ran an 11.11 in the 100m contest.

References

1967 births
Living people
Sammarinese male sprinters
Athletes (track and field) at the 1988 Summer Olympics
Athletes (track and field) at the 1992 Summer Olympics
Olympic athletes of San Marino
Athletes (track and field) at the 1991 Mediterranean Games
Mediterranean Games competitors for San Marino